Leeuwin Ocean Adventure Foundation is a nonprofit organization based in Fremantle, Western Australia that operates the sail training ship STS Leeuwin II. It was formed in 1986 and is funded by grants, corporate sponsorships and donations.

The Foundation offers training voyages along the Western Australian coast ranging from three days up to a week, as well as day trips of 34 hours.

References

Further reading

External links
 

Fremantle
Non-profit organisations based in Western Australia
Sailing in Australia